Year 1262 (MCCLXII) was a common year starting on Sunday (link will display the full calendar) of the Julian calendar.

Events 
 By place 

 Mongol Empire 
 Berke–Hulagu War: Mongol forces under Berke Khan, ruler of the Golden Horde, raid territory in the Caucasus belonging to his cousin Hulagu Khan, ruler of the Ilkhanate. Berke supports the Georgian rebels and allies with the Mamluks. He defeats the Ilkhanate forces on the Terek River, together with the Mamluk army led by Baibars (or Abu al-Futuh), saving Palestine and Arabia from Ilkhanate occupation.

 Europe 
 March 8 – Battle of Hausbergen: The bourgeois of Strasbourg defeat a German army of knights (some 5,000 men) under Bishop Walter of Geroldseck. Strasbourg becomes an imperial Free City of the Holy Roman Empire.
 May – King Alfonso X (the Wise) of Castile and León, at a meeting in Jaén, demands military support from Muhammad I, ruler of Granada, and relenquishes the ports of Tarifa and Algeciras to prepare an invasion of North Africa.
 September 14 – Castilian-Leonese forces led by Alfonso X (the Wise) conquer Cádiz, the city has been under Moorish rule since 711. The Muslims are ousted, and Alfonso repopulates the region (also called the Repoblación).
 The Icelandic Commonwealth enters into the Old Covenant (also called Gissurarsáttmáli), establishing a union with Norway, and acknowledges King Haakon Iv (the Old) as its ruler.
 King Mindaugas renounces Christianity, returning to his pagan roots, and reverting to Grand Duke of Lithuania.

 Levant 
 Al-Hakim I, a member of the Abbasid Dynasty, travels to Egypt and is proclaimed as caliph of Cairo in succession to his former rival Al-Mustansir II. After his arrival, he is imprisoned at the Citadel of Cairo by orders of Sultan Baibars and released in  1296 by Sultan Lajin.

 Asia 
 King Mangrai of the Lan Na Kingdom (modern Northern Thailand) founds the city of Chiang Rai, as the kingdom's capital.

 By topic 

 Arts and Culture 
 Adam de la Halle, French trouvère and musician, writes the first operetta, "Le Jeu de la Feuillee".

 Markets 
 The Venetian Senate starts consolidating all of the city's outstanding debt into a single fund, later known as the Monte Vecchio. The holders of the newly created prestiti are promised a 5% annual coupon. These claims can be sold, and quickly (before 1320) give rise to the first recorded secondary market for financial assets, in Medieval Europe.

 Religion 
 Richard of Chichester is canonized as a saint; he is best known for authoring the prayer later adapted into the song Day by Day, in the musical Godspell.

 Science and Technology 
 Alfonso X (the Wise) commissions Yehuda ben Moshe and Isaac ibn Sid to compile the Alfonsine Tables, describing the movement of the planets.

Births 
 May 6 – John Hastings, English nobleman and knight (d. 1313)
 August 5 – Ladisslaus IV (the Cuman), king of Hungary (d. 1290)
 October 18 – Ranulph Neville (or Ralph), English nobleman (d. 1331)
 Bérenger de Landore, French preacher and archbishop (d. 1330)
 Elisabeth of Carinthia (or Tyrol), queen of Germany (d. 1312)
 Guan Daogao, Chinese calligrapher, poet and painter (d. 1319)
 Guan Daosheng, Chinese painter, poet and writer (d. 1319)
 John II (Megas Komnenos), emperor of Trebizond (d. 1297)
 John of Castile, Spanish prince (infante) and regent (d. 1319)
 Takatsukasa Kanetada, Japanese nobleman (kugyō) ((d. 1301)
 U Tak (or Woo Tak), Korean scholar and philosopher (d. 1342)
 William de Cantilupe, Norman nobleman and knight (d. 1308)

Deaths 
 April 23 – Giles of Assisi, companion of Francis of Assisi (b. 1190)
 May 18 – John Climping, English cleric, chancellor and bishop
 June 23 – Siemowit I, Polish nobleman and knight (House of Piast)
 July 13 – Henry Wingham, English Lord Chancellor and bishop 
 July 14 – Richard de Clare, English nobleman and knight (b. 1222)
 August 24 – Robert de Mariscis, English priest and archdeacon
 September 1 – Giuliana of Collalto, Italian Benedictine abbess
 September 12 – Baldwin de Redvers, English nobleman (b. 1236)
 October 5 – Teruko, Japanese princess and empress (b. 1224)
 December 13 – Giles of Bridport, English archdeacon and bishop
 December 21 – Bahauddin Zakariya, Ghurid scholar and poet
 Ibn al-Adim, Syrian diplomat, biographer and historian (b. 1192)
 Izz al-Din ibn 'Abd al-Salam, Syrian jurist and theologian (b. 1181)
 Matilda II (or Maud), French noblewoman and regent (b. 1235)
 Mem Soares de Melo, Portuguese nobleman and knight (b. 1200)
 Peter de Rivaux, English High Sheriff and Lord High Treasurer

References